Vernéřov (German: Wernersreuth) is a village in Karlovy Vary Region, Czech Republic. It is the third largest town district of Aš. In 2001 the village had a population of 106.

In the village there are a market, restaurant, bus stop and a few ponds.

Geography 
Vernéřov lies 3 kilometres east from Aš, about 602 meters above sea level. It neighbours with Aš to the west, with Nebesa to the south, with Horní Paseky to the east and with Dolní Paseky to the north. The river Bílý Halštrov flows through the village.

History 
Vernéřov was first mentioned in 1395. From 1490 to the early 18th century tin, gold and silver were mined in the nearby mines.

Landmarks 
 World War I Memorial,
 School building,
 Petrova studánka (Fountain of Peter) from 1912.

Gallery

References 

Aš
Villages in Cheb District